Ain't Playin' is the seventh album by Sean T. It was released on October 4, 2005 for Get Gone Records and was produced by Sean T and Ghazi Shami.

Track listing
"Intro" – 1:21  
"Punchlines" – 3:11  
"We Don't Stop" – 3:43 (Featuring Keak da Sneak) 
"Gimme That" – 3:06  
"Cocky" – 3:45 (Featuring Messy Marv) 
"Scream at Me" – 3:58  
"Thas the Spirit" – 2:57  
"In Yo Look" – 3:44  
"All We Do" – 3:33  
"Jus Don't Get It" – 2:39  
"Ain't Playin'" – 4:15  
"Rowdy" – 3:49  
"We Beastin'" – 3:29 (Featuring Turf Talk, Mr. Sandman)  
"Transformin" – 3:37  
"Down Ass B" – 4:17 (Featuring Blue Chip, PSD)
"Long Time Comin'" – 3:53 (Featuring San Quinn)

2005 albums
Sean T albums